The Piper–Beebe House, located at 2 S. A St. in Virginia City, Nevada, is a historic Italianate house that is listed on the National Register of Historic Places.  It was an 1876 work of Virginia City builder/architect A.F. MacKay, the only one of his works in Virginia City that survives.  It was built after the "Great Fire" of 1875 that destroyed much of the city.

The house was listed on the National Register of Historic Places in 1993.  It has also been known as the Piper–Clegg House.  It is also listed on the National Register as a contributing building within the National Historic Landmark Virginia City Historic District.  It was deemed significant for association with its owners and for its architecture.

References

External links
Piper–Beebe House, a National Park Service travel page

Buildings and structures in Virginia City, Nevada
Houses completed in 1876
1876 establishments in Nevada
Houses on the National Register of Historic Places in Nevada
National Register of Historic Places in Storey County, Nevada
Italianate architecture in Nevada
Houses in Storey County, Nevada